Placebo Cure is a Hong Kong modern serial drama produced by TVB and starring Sunny Chan, Joyce Tang and Kevin Cheng. The drama was filmed from November 2003 to early 2004 and was first released overseas in May 2005. It was then aired in Hong Kong on Super Sun's TVB Drama channel from 30 May to 24 June 2005. It was then aired on TVB Jade from 19 October to 16 November 2006.

Cast

Main cast

Other cast

References

External links
Official website

TVB dramas
2005 Hong Kong television series debuts
2005 Hong Kong television series endings
2006 Hong Kong television series debuts
2006 Hong Kong television series endings
Hong Kong television shows
Serial drama television series